Ivan Ljubic (born 7 July 1996) is an Austrian footballer currently playing for Sturm Graz.

Personal life
Ljubic was born in Austria, and is of Croatian descent.

References

External links
 

1996 births
Living people
Footballers from Vienna
Austrian footballers
Austrian people of Croatian descent
SV Horn players
2. Liga (Austria) players
Association football defenders